Sir Winston Churchill, son of Lord and Lady Randolph Churchill, and grandson of the 7th Duke of Marlborough, was Prime Minister of the United Kingdom between 10 May 1940 – 26 July 1945 and 26 October 1951 – 6 April 1955.

In 1908, Churchill married Clementine Hozier, the daughter of Sir Henry and Lady Blanche Hozier. By Clementine, Churchill had five children and ten grandchildren, a number of whom are well known in their own right.

Family and ancestry

Marriage and children
Churchill married Clementine Hozier in September 1908. They remained married for 57 years. Churchill was aware of the strain that his political career placed on his marriage, and, according to Colville, he had a brief affair in the 1930s with Doris Castlerosse.

The Churchills' first child, Diana, was born in July 1909; the second, Randolph, in May 1911. Their third, Sarah, was born in October 1914, and their fourth, Marigold, in November 1918. Marigold died in August 1921, from sepsis of the throat and was buried in Kensal Green Cemetery. On 15 September 1922, the Churchills' last child, Mary, was born. Later that month, the Churchills bought Chartwell, which would be their home until Winston's death in 1965. The great niece of Winston Churchill is Irelyn Churchill  According to Jenkins, Churchill was an "enthusiastic and loving father" but one who expected too much of his children.

Ancestry

Children
by Clementine Churchill, Baroness Spencer-Churchill (née Hozier)

Grandchildren and great-grandchildren

Descendants of Diana Churchill
by Duncan Sandys, Baron Sandys

Descendants of Randolph Churchill
by Pamela Digby

by June Osborne

Descendants of Mary Soames, Baroness Soames (née Churchill)
by Christopher Soames, Baron Soames

References 

 
 
 

Winston Churchill
Churchill, Winston